"The Tide Is Turning (After Live Aid)" is the closing track from Roger Waters' second studio album, Radio K.A.O.S. It was released as the album's third single, in November 1987. A live version of the song was released as the second single from Waters' debut live album, The Wall – Live in Berlin in November 1990.

Background
Though Waters had offered his services for the Live Aid concert in 1985 and been turned down by organizer Bob Geldof, the event still inspired Waters to write this song. After he had recorded the Radio K.A.O.S. album, which ended with a simulated nuclear attack in the song "Four Minutes," his record company informed him that the album was too bleak and needed a more upbeat ending. Waters then recorded and added "The Tide Is Turning" to give the album a more optimistic finish.

Release
It was released as a CD single that included a live version of the Pink Floyd song "Money", written by Waters for their highly successful 1973 album The Dark Side of the Moon. It was recorded during Waters' Radio K.A.O.S. Tour, in which he toured the United States and Canada for four months, ending with two dates at Wembley Arena in the UK, in late 1987. It also included an unreleased track that was recorded during the sessions for Radio KAOS but not used. "Get Back to Radio" (listed as a demo recording, i.e., not a finished track), was originally written to be an album opener, but later scrapped after the story for Radio KAOS was fully developed. The demo itself does not follow nor reference Billy or the story of Radio KAOS.

Track listings

Charts

Release history

The Wall – Live In Berlin version

Waters performed "The Tide Is Turning" with Joni Mitchell, Cyndi Lauper, Bryan Adams, Van Morrison with The Band and Paul Carrack and the Rundfunk Orchestra & Choir in the 1990 concert, The Wall Live in Berlin. It served as the closing number of Waters' famous 1990 performance of The Wall in Berlin, replacing "Outside the Wall", which is the closing track on The Wall and all of its subsequent tours. Although not shown on the track list of the album, "Outside the Wall" is affixed to the end of "The Tide Is Turning."

Track listings

Release History

References

External links
Roger Waters official website

1987 songs
Anti-war songs
CBS Records singles
Columbia Records singles
EMI Records singles
Mercury Records singles
Roger Waters songs
Songs written by Roger Waters
Songs about nuclear war and weapons
Songs about poverty